Maithili is an Indo-Aryan language spoken in parts of India and Nepal. It is native to the Mithila region, which encompasses parts of the Indian states of Bihar and Jharkhand as well as Nepal's eastern Terai. It is one of the 22 officially recognised languages of India and the second most spoken Nepalese language in Nepal.

The language is predominantly written in Devanagari, but there were two other historically important scripts: Tirhuta, which has retained some use until the present, and Kaithi.

Official status
In 2003, Maithili was included in the Eighth Schedule of the Indian Constitution as a recognised Indian language, which allows it to be used in education, government, and other official contexts in India. Maithili language is included as an optional paper in the UPSC Exam. In March 2018, Maithili received the second official language status in the Indian state of Jharkhand.

Gopal Jee Thakur of the Bharatiya Janata Party is the first Member of Parliament, Lok Sabha who speaks in the Maithili language in the Parliament of India. He is currently the MP for Darbhanga.

The Language Commission of Nepal has recommended Maithili language to be made an official administrative language in Koshi province and Madhesh Province.

Geographic distribution
In India, Maithili is spoken mainly in Bihar and Jharkhand in the districts of Darbhanga, Saharsa, Samastipur, Madhubani, Muzaffarpur, Sitamarhi, Begusarai, Munger, Khagaria, Purnia, Katihar, Kishanganj, Sheohar, Bhagalpur, Madhepura, Araria, Supaul, Vaishali and Deoghar as well as other districts of Santhal Pargana division. Darbhanga, Madhubani, Saharsa and Purnia constitute cultural and linguistic centers.

In Nepal, Maithili is spoken mainly in the Outer Terai districts including Sarlahi, Mahottari, Dhanusa, Sunsari, Siraha, Morang and Saptari Districts. Janakpur is an important linguistic centre of Maithili.

Classification
In the 19th century, linguistic scholars considered Maithili as a dialect of Bihari languages and grouped it with other languages spoken in Bihar. Hoernlé compared it with the Gaudian languages and recognised that it shows more similarities with the Bengali languages than with Hindi. Grierson recognised it as a distinct language and published its first grammar in 1881.

Chatterji grouped Maithili with the Magadhi Prakrit.

Dialects 

Maithili varies greatly in dialects. The standard form of Maithili is  Central Maithili which is mainly spoken in Darbhanga, Begusarai district , Madhubani district and Saharsa district in Bihar, India.
Bajjika (Western Maithili) is spoken in Sitamarhi, Muzaffarpur, Vaishali, East Champaran, Sheohar and Eastern part of Saran of Bihar in India. Western Maithili is listed as a distinct language in Nepal and overlaps by 76–86% with Maithili dialects spoken in Dhanusa, Morang, Saptari, and Sarlahi Districts.
Thēthi Maithili is spoken mainly in Kosi, Purnia and Munger divisions and Patna's Mokama in Bihar, India and some adjoining districts of Nepal.
Angika (Chhika Chhiki Maithili) is spoken in and around the Bhagalpur, Banka, Jamui, Munger and Santhal Pargana division.
Eastern Maithili mainly spoken in Kishanganj, Araria, Purnia also some part of Katihar.
Southern Maithili widely spoken in Deoghar also called Deogharia Maithili.
Several other dialects of Maithili are spoken in India and Nepal, including Dehati, Deshi, Kisan, Bantar, Barmeli, Musar, Tati and Jolaha. All the dialects are intelligible to native Maithili speakers.

Origin and history
The name Maithili is derived from the word Mithila, an ancient kingdom of which King Janaka was the ruler (see Ramayana). Maithili is also one of the names of Sita, the wife of King Rama and daughter of King Janaka. Scholars in Mithila used Sanskrit for their literary work and Maithili was the language of the common folk (Abahatta).

The beginning of Maithili language and literature can be traced back to the 'Charyapadas', a form of Buddhist mystical verses, composed during the period of 700-1300 AD. These padas were written in Sandhya bhasa by several Siddhas who belonged to Vajrayana Buddhism and were scattered throughout the territory of Assam, Bengal, Bihar and Odisha. Several of Siddas were from Mithila region such as Kanhapa, Sarhapa etc. Prominent scholars like Rahul Sankrityanan, Subhadra Jha and Jayakant Mishra provided evidence and proved that the language of  Charyapada is ancient Maithili or proto Maithili.
Apart from Charyapadas, there has been rich tradition of folk culture, folk songs and which were popular among common folks of Mithila region.

After the fall of Pala rule, disappearance of Buddhism, establishment of Karnāta kings and patronage of Maithili under Harisimhadeva (1226–1324) of Karnāta dynasty dates back to the 14th century (around 1327 AD). Jyotirishwar Thakur (1280–1340) wrote a unique work Varnaratnākara in Maithili prose. The Varna Ratnākara is the earliest known prose text, written by Jyotirishwar Thakur in Mithilaksar script, and is the first prose work not only in Maithili but in any modern Indian language.

In 1324, Ghyasuddin Tughluq, the emperor of Delhi invaded Mithila, defeated Harisimhadeva, entrusted Mithila to his family priest and a great Military Scholar Kameshvar Jha, a Maithil Brahmin of the Oinwar dynasty. But the disturbed era did not produce any literature in Maithili until Vidyapati Thakur (1360 to 1450), who was an epoch-making poet under the patronage of king Shiva Singh and his queen Lakhima Devi. He produced over 1,000 immortal songs in Maithili on the theme of love of Radha and Krishna and the domestic life of Shiva and Parvati as well as on the subject of suffering of migrant labourers of Morang and their families; besides, he wrote a number of treaties in Sanskrit. His love-songs spread far and wide in no time and enchanted saints, poets and youth. Chaitanya Mahaprabhu saw the divine light of love behind these songs, and soon these songs became themes of Vaisnava sect of Bengal. Rabindranath Tagore, out of curiosity, imitated these songs under the pseudonym Bhanusimha. Vidyapati influenced the religious literature of Asama, Bengal, Utkala and gave birth to a new Brajabuli language.

The earliest reference to Maithili or Tirhutiya is in Amaduzzi's preface to Beligatti's Alphabetum Brammhanicum, published in 1771. This contains a list of Indian languages amongst which is 'Tourutiana.' Colebrooke's essay on the Sanskrit and Prakrit languages, written in 1801, was the first to describe Maithili as a distinct dialect.

Many devotional songs were written by Vaisnava saints, including in the mid-17th century, Vidyapati and Govindadas. Mapati Upadhyaya wrote a drama titled Pārijātaharaṇa in Maithili. Professional troupes, mostly from dalit classes known as Kirtanias, the singers of bhajan or devotional songs, started to perform this drama in public gatherings and the courts of the nobles.
Lochana (c. 1575 – c. 1660) wrote Rāgatarangni, a significant treatise on the science of music, describing the rāgas, tālas, and lyrics prevalent in Mithila.

During the Malla dynasty's rule Maithili spread far and wide throughout Nepal from the 16th to the 17th century. During this period, at least seventy Maithili dramas were produced. In the drama Harishchandranrityam by Siddhinarayanadeva (1620–57), some characters speak pure colloquial Maithili, while others speak Bengali, Sanskrit or Prakrit.

After the demise of Maheshwar Singh, the ruler of Darbhanga Raj, in 1860, the Raj was taken over by the British Government as regent. The Darbhanga Raj returned to his successor, Maharaj Lakshmishvar Singh, in 1898. The Zamindari Raj had a lackadaisical approach toward Maithili. The use of Maithili language was revived through personal efforts of MM Parameshvar Mishra, Chanda Jha, Munshi Raghunandan Das and others.

Publication of Maithil Hita Sadhana (1905), Mithila Moda (1906), and Mithila Mihir (1908) further encouraged writers. The first social organisation, Maithil Mahasabha, was established in 1910 for the development of Mithila and Maithili. It blocked its membership for people outside of the Maithil Brahmin and Karna Kayastha castes. Maithil Mahasabha campaigned for the official recognition of Maithili as a regional language. Calcutta University recognised Maithili in 1917, and other universities followed suit.

Babu Bhola Lal Das wrote Maithili Grammar (Maithili Vyakaran). He edited a book Gadya Kusumanjali and edited a journal Maithili.
In 1965, Maithili was officially accepted by Sahitya Academy, an organisation dedicated to the promotion of Indian literature.

In 2002, Maithili was recognised on the VIII schedule of the Indian Constitution as a major Indian language; Maithili is now one of the twenty-two Scheduled languages of India.

The publishing of Maithili books in Mithilakshar script was started by Acharya Ramlochan Saran.

Phonology

Vowels

All vowels have nasal counterparts, represented by "~" in IPA and ँ on the vowels, like आँ  ãː .
All vowel sounds are realised as nasal when occurring before or after a nasal consonant.
 Sounds eː and oː are often replaced by diphthongs əɪ̯ and əʊ̯.
ɔ is replaced by ə in northern dialects and by o in southernmost dialects.
There are three short vowels that were described by Grierson, but are not counted by modern grammarians. But they could be understood as syllable break: ॳ / ɘ̆ /,  इ/ ɪ̆ /,  उ/ ʊ̆ / . Or as syllable break ऺ in Devanagari and "." in IPA.
 ꣾ is a Unicode letter in Devanagari, (IPA /əe̯/) which is not supported currently on several browsers and operating systems, along with its mātrā (vowel sign).

The following diphthongs are present:
 अय़(ꣾ) / əe̯ / ~ /ɛː/ - अय़सन (ꣾ सन) / əe̯sən / ~ /ɛːsɐn/ 'like this'
 अव़(ॵ) / əo̯ / ~ /ɔː/- चव़मुख(चॏमुख) / tɕəo̯mʊkʰ / ~ /tɕɔːmʊkʰ/ 'four faced'
 अयॆ / əe̯ / - अयॆलाः / əe̯laːh / 'came'
 अवॊ (अऒ) / əo̯ / - अवॊताः / əo̯taːh / 'will come'
 आइ / aːi̯ / - आइ / aːi̯ / 'today'
 आउ / aːu̯ / - आउ / aːu̯ / 'come please'
 आयॆ (आऎ) / aːe̯ / - आयॆल / aːe̯l / 'came'
 आवॊ (आऒ) / aːo̯ / - आवॊब / aːo̯b / 'will come'
 यु (इउ) / iu̯/ - घ्यु / ghiu̯ / 'ghee'
 यॆ (इऎ) / ie̯ / - यॆः / ie̯h / 'only this'
 यॊ (इऒ) / io̯ / - कह्यो / kəhio̯ / 'any day'
 वि (उइ) / ui̯ / - द्वि / dui̯ / 'two'
 वॆ (उऎ) /ue̯/ -  वॆ: / ue̯h / 'only that'

A peculiar type of phonetic change is recently taking place in Maithili by way of epenthesis, i.e. backward transposition of final i and u in all sort of words. Thus:

Standard Colloquial - Common Pronunciation
 अछि / əchi / - अइछ / əich / 'is'
 रवि / rəbi / - रइब / rəib / 'Sunday'
 मधु / mədhu / - मउध / məudh / 'honey'
 बालु / ba:lu / - बाउल / ba:ul / 'sand'

Consonants
Maithili has four classes of stops, one class of affricate, which is generally treated as a stop series, related nasals, fricatives and approximant.

Stops
There are four series of stops- bilabials, coronals, retroflex and velar, along with an affricate series. All of them show the four way contrast like most of the modern Indo-Aryan languages:

 tenuis, as /p/, which is like ⟨p⟩ in English spin
 voiced, as /b/, which is like ⟨b⟩ in English bin
 aspirated, as /pʰ/, which is like ⟨p⟩ in English pin, and
 murmured or aspirated voiced, as /bʱ/.

Apart from the retroflex series, all the rest four series show full phonological contrast in all positions. The retroflex tenius ʈ and ʈʰ show full contrast in all positions. ɖ and ɖʱ show phonological contrast mainly word-initially. Both are defective phonemes, occurring intervocalically an word finally only if preceded by a nasal consonant.

Fricatives

 Fricative sounds  only occur marginally, and are typically pronounced as a dental fricative // in most styles of pronunciation.ः is always added after a vowel.

Sonorants
It is the only nasal which does not occur independently.
 In most styles of pronunciation, the retroflex flap  occurs marginally, and is usually pronounced as an alveolar tap // sound.
 Approximant sounds  and  fricative sounds , mainly occur in words that are borrowed from Sanskrit or in words of Perso-Arabic origin. From Sanskrit, puʂp(ə) as puɸp(ə). Conjunct of ɦj as ɦʑ as in graɦjə as graɦʑə.

There are four non-syllabic vowels in Maithili-
i̯, u̯, e̯, o̯ written in Devanagari as य़, व़, य़ॆ, व़ॊ. Most of the times, these are written without nukta.

Morphology

Nouns
An example declension:

Adjectives
The difference between adjectives and nouns is very minute in Maithili. However, there are marked adjectives there in Maithili.

Pronouns

Pronouns in Maithili are declined in similar way to nominals, though in most pronouns the genitive case has a different form. The lower forms below are accusative and postpositional. The plurals are formed periphrastically.

Writing system

Beginning in the 14th century, the language was written in the Tirhuta script (also known as Mithilakshara or Maithili), which is related to the Bengali script. By the early 20th century, this script was largely associated with the Mithila Brahmans, with most others using Kaithi, and Devanagari spreading under the influence of the scholars at Banaras. Throughout the course of the century,  Devanagari grew in use eventually replacing the other two, and has since remained the dominant script for Maithili. Tirhuta retained some specific uses (on signage in north Bihar as well as in religious texts, genealogical records and letters), and has seen a resurgence of interest in the 21st century.

The Tirhuta and Kaithi scripts are both currently included in Unicode.

Literature

Sample Text
The following sample text is Maithili translation of Article 1 of the Universal Declaration of Human Rights:

Maithili in the Tirhuta alphabet

Maithili in the Devanagari alphabet

Maithili in IAST

Anuccheda Eka: Sabha mānaba janmataha svatantra achi tathā garimā ā adhikārme samāna achi. Sabhkẽ apana-apana buddhi ā bibeka chaika āora sabhkẽ eka dosarāka prati sauhardapurna byabahāra karabāka cāhī.

Translation

Article 1: All human beings are born free and equal in dignity and rights. They possess conscience and reason. Therefore, everyone should act in a spirit of brotherhood towards each other.

See also
 Languages with official status in India
 List of Indian languages by total speakers

Notes

Citations

External links

 UCLA Language Materials Project : Maithili
 National Translation Mission's (NTM) Maithili Pages
 Videha Ist Maithili 
 Maithili Books

 
Bihari languages
Culture of Mithila
Eastern Indo-Aryan languages
Languages attested from the 14th century
Languages of Bihar
Languages of India
Languages of Jharkhand
Languages of Nepal
Languages officially written in Indic scripts
Official languages of India
Sahitya Akademi recognised languages
Languages of Bagmati Province
Languages of Koshi Province
Languages of Madhesh Province
Languages of Lumbini Province